The Lisoish languages are a branch of the Loloish languages proposed by Ziwo Lama (2012) that includes Lisu and several of the Yi languages. David Bradley (1997) considers Lisoish languages to be part of the Central Loloish branch.

Languages and classifications

Lama (2012)

David Bradley (2007) considers Lisu, Lipo, and Lamu to form a Lisoid subgroup.

Other Lisoish languages are:
Miqie (Micha)
Lamu
Limi
Lalo languages: Lalo, Yangliu, Eka, Mangdi, Xuzhang
Taloid languages: Talu, Lavu, Lang'e, Tagu, Popei, Naruo, Kua-nsi, Kuamasi, Laizisi, Zibusi, Sonaga, Gomotage

The following two of the six Yi languages (fangyan 方言) officially recognized by the Chinese government belong to Lama's Lisoish clade. (The remaining four are Nisoish.)
Western Yi (Lalo 腊罗)
Central Yi (Lolopo 倮倮泼)

Names for Lolopo varieties include Enipu 厄尼蒲, Qiangyi 羌夷, Tuzu 土族, and Xiangtang 香堂.

Chen (2010)
Chen (2010) lists the following dialects for "Lolo" (倮倮) languages, which corresponds to Lama's (2012) Lisoish clade. The position of Lisu is not addressed. Also listed are the counties where each respective dialect is spoken.

Lolo 倮倮方言
Lolo, Luóluó 倮倮次方言: 600,000 speakers in all counties of Chuxiong Yi Autonomous Prefecture
Lalu, Làlǔ 腊鲁次方言
Lalu, Làlǔ 腊鲁: 250,000 speakers in Dali, Weishan, Midu, Yongping, Baoshan, etc.
Lalo, Làluó 腊罗: 250,000 speakers in Dali, Weishan, Yunxian, Changning, Nanjian, Lincang, Shuangjiang, Midu, Jingdong, Jinggu, etc.
Lipo, Lǐpō 里泼次方言
Lipo, Lǐpō 里泼: 200,000 speakers in Luquan, Wuding, Yongsheng, Huaping, etc.
Lavu, Lāwù 拉务: 50,000 speakers in Yongsheng
Talu, Tǎlǔ 塔鲁: 50,000 speakers in Yongsheng, Huaping, etc.
Toloza, Tánglángràng 堂郎让: 2,000+ speakers in Tai'an Township, Lijiang County

Hsiu (2016)
Below is a classification of the Lisoish languages by Hsiu (2016) based on a phylogenetic analysis of selected lexical isoglosses.

Lisoish
Toloza
Lavu, Talu
Heqing cluster
Kua-nsi
Kuamasi, Laizisi, Zibusi
Sonaga
Lolopo linkage
Hlersu / Shansu
Luquan Lisu (Lipha)
Lolo(po)
Lipo
? Tu / Tuzu / Tujia
Tulao of Jinping (?)
? Qiangyi
? Xiangtang
Lisu
Mili
Limi
Lalo
Alu
Eka
Mangdi
Xuzhang-Lalo
Xuzhang
Lalo
Eastern
Central, Western

Other languages
The Chuxiong Prefecture Ethnic Gazetteer (2013:364) lists the following cognate percentages between Lolopo 罗罗濮 and other Yi languages in Chuxiong Prefecture.
Ache 阿车: 74.86% (211/282)
Chesu 车苏: 55% (155/282)
Luowu 罗武: 75.89% (214/282)
Shansu 山苏: 78.4% (221/282)
Lipo 里濮: 93.36% (253/271)

Yang, et al. (2017) lists the following languages as part of the Taloid branch, whose speakers are descendants of soldiers sent by the Nanzhao Kingdom from the Dali region to be stationed in northwestern Yunnan. Taloid languages are most closely related to Lalo, Lolopo, and Lipo, all of which share the lexical innovation a¹toL for 'fire'. They are spoken primarily in Yongsheng County and Heqing County. Popei 泼佩 is spoken in Huaping County, while Gomotage is spoken in Eryuan County.
Talu 他留, Nazan 纳咱
Lang'e 崀峨, Lawu 拉务
Tagu 塔古
Popei 泼佩 (Shuitian 水田)
Naruo 纳若 (Shuitian 水田)
Kua-nsi 跨恩斯
Kuamasi 跨玛斯
Laizisi 莱兹斯
Zibusi 子逋斯
Sonaga 锁内嘎
Gomotage 俄毛柔

Tazhi of Puwei Township 普威镇, northern Miyi County 米易县, Sichuan may also be a Taloid language.

Cathryn Yang (2010:7) also suggests that Wotizo (wɔ21 ti33 zɔ21) of Midu County may probably be related to Lolo (Lolopo).

Cathryn Yang (2010) lists the following 4 languages as peripheral Lalo languages. Hsiu (2017)  suggests that Alu is also likely a peripheral Lalo language.
Yangliu
Eka
Mangdi
Xuzhang

Bradley (2007) reports the moribund language Samatu as a Laloid language.

Tulao of Jinping County (spoken in the 2 villages of Yugadi 鱼嘎底, Xinzhai Village 新寨村, Mengqiao Township ; and Laowangzhai 老王寨, Qingjiao Village 箐脚村, Dazhai Township ) may fit in the Lisoish branch, although this is uncertain due to lack of data.

Other languages that may be Lisoish include (see also List of lesser-known Loloish languages):
Gaiji 改积 of central Yun County
Gaisu, Western 改苏(西) (Luoren) of northeastern Yongde County
Gepo, Western 葛泼(西) of Liuhe Township 六合彝族乡, Heqing County
Pengzi 棚子 of Wumulong Township 乌木龙彝族乡 (and possibly also Mengban Township 勐板乡), Yongde County
Suan 蒜 of Wumulong Township 乌木龙彝族乡 and Mengban Township 勐板乡, Yongde County
Western Samadu 撒马堵(西) of Zhenkang County (pop. 6,000), Yongde County (pop. 1,500)

Lolopo varieties:
Enipu 厄尼蒲 of Nanjian County (pop. 11,000) and Weishan County (pop. 5,000)
Maci 骂池 of Maci village 骂池, Taipingdi Village Cluster 太平地村, Yongding City 永定镇, northeastern Yongren County
Qiangyi 羌夷 of Xiangyun County (pop. 9,000) and Binchuan County (pop. 1,000)
Tusu 土族 of Xiangyun County
Xiangtang 香堂 of southwestern Yunnan
Xijima 洗期麻 of central Yun County

Below are autonyms of Central Yi (彝语中部方言) speakers as listed in the Yunnan Province Ethnic Minority Languages Gazetteer (1997) (云南省志：少数民族语言文字志; p. 57):
 (Lolopo language)
 (Lipo language)
 (Micha language)

 (Shansu language)

Innovations
Lama (2012) lists the following sound changes from Proto-Loloish as Lisoish innovations.
 *m- > zero
 *m- > p-

References

Chen Kang [陈康]. 2010. A study of Yi dialects [彝语方言研究]. Beijing: China Minzu University Press.
Lama, Ziwo Qiu-Fuyuan (2012), Subgrouping of Nisoic (Yi) Languages, thesis, University of Texas at Arlington (archived)